Poaceae, or Gramineae, grasses are very important food plants for the caterpillars of a number of Lepidoptera (butterflies and moths), including:

Monophagous
Species which feed exclusively on Poaceae:

 Bedelliidae
 Bedellia oplismeniella – only on Oplismenus compositus, Panicum torridum, and some others
 Bedellia struthionella – only on Panicum torridum
 Coleophoridae
 Several Coleophora case-bearer species:
 C. manitoba
 C. pulchricornis – only on sugarcane (Saccharum officinarum)
 C. vagans
 Gelechiidae
 Chionodes psiloptera – only on meadow-grasses (Poa) and some others
 Hepialidae
 Wiseana jocosa
 Wiseana signata
 Wiseana umbraculatus
 Hesperiidae
Poanes aaroni (saffron skipper) – only on smooth cordgrass (Spartina alterniflora)
 Poanes hobomok (Hobomok skipper) – only on Panicum, meadow-grasses (Poa), and some others
 Poanes yehl (Yehl skipper) – only on Arundinaria
 Poanes zabulon (Zabulon skipper) – only on bentgrasses (Agrostis), cocksfoot (Dactylis), Elytrigia, lovegrasses (Eragrostis), Leymus, meadow-grasses (Poa), alkali grasses (Puccinellia), Tridens, and some others
 Noctuidae
 Apamea crenata (clouded-bordered brindle) – only on cocksfoot (Dactylis), hair grasses (Deschampsia), fescues (Festuca), Phalaris, and some others
 Apamea monoglypha (dark arches) – only on hair grasses (Deschampsia), fescues (Festuca), and some others
 Apamea remissa (dusky brocade) – only on small-reeds (Calamagrostis), hair grasses (Deschampsia), festuces (Festuca), Phalaris, ryes (Secale), and some others
 Apamea sordens (rustic shoulder-knot) – only on oats (Avena), cocksfoot (Dactylis), festuces (Festuca), barleys (Hordeum), Leymus, Phalaris, catstails (Phleum), ryes (Secale), wheats (Triticum), teosintes and maize (Zea), wild rice (Zizania), and perhaps some others
 Cerapteryx graminis (antler moth) – only on hair grasses (Deschampsia), festuces (Festuca), Nardus, and some others
 Leucania comma (shoulder-striped wainscot) – only on hair grasses (Deschampsia), festuces (Festuca), and some others
 Mythimna ferrago (the clay) – only on hair grasses (Deschampsia) and some others
 Mythimna pallens (common wainscot) – only on hair grasses (Deschampsia), festuces (Festuca), Leymus, ryegrasses (Lolium), Phalaris, and some others
 Oligia latruncula (tawny marbled minor) – only on small-reed (Calamagrostis), cocksfoot (Dactylis), and some others
 Oligia strigilis (marbled minor) – only on crested-wheat grasses (Agropyron), cocksfoot (Dactylis), Elytrigia, meadow-grasses (Poa), and some others
 Oligia versicolor (rufous minor)
 Omphaloscelis lunosa (lunar underwing)
 Thalpophila matura (straw underwing) – only on cocksfoot (Dactylis) and some others

Polyphagous
Species which feed on Poaceae and other plants:

 Arctiidae
 Hypercompe eridanus – recorded on Panicum and possibly others
 Coleophoridae
 Several Coleophora case-bearer species:
 C. lixella – recorded on quaking grasses (Briza), soft-grasses (Holcus), and possibly others
 C. ornatipennella
 C. tricolor
 C. viridicuprella
 Crambidae
 Agriphila inquinatella – recorded on sheep's fescue (Festuca ovina), meadow-grasses (Poa), and others
 Hepialidae
 Hepialus humuli (ghost moth)
 Korscheltellus lupulina (common swift)
 Wiseana cervinata
 Hesperiidae
 Poanes viator (broad-winged skipper) – recorded on Panicum, common reeds (Phragmites), wild rice (Zizania), Zizaniopsis, and possibly others
 Noctuidae
 Eugnorisma glareosa (autumnal rustic) – recorded on meadow-grasses (Poa) and others
 Euxoa nigricans (garden dart)
 Mythimna impura (smoky wainscot) – recorded on foxtail grasses (Alopecurus), cocksfoot (Dactylis), hair grasses (Deschampsia), Leymus, common reeds (Phragmites), and others
 Noctua pronuba (large yellow underwing)
 Xestia sexstrigata (six-striped rustic)
 Xestia xanthographa (square-spot rustic)

References

External links

Grasses
Grasses
Poaceae
Lepidoptera food